Uesslingen is a village and former municipality in the canton of Thurgau, Switzerland. In 1995, the municipality was merged with the neighboring municipality Buch bei Frauenfeld to form a new and larger municipality Uesslingen-Buch.

Former municipalities of Thurgau
Villages in Switzerland